Drew Shepherd (born December 25, 1994) is an American professional soccer player.

Career

College & Youth 
Shepherd played college soccer at Western Michigan University between 2014 and 2017, including spending a year as a redshirt in 2013. While with the Broncos, Shepherd made 60 appearances and contributed 29 shutouts.

During his time in college, Shepherd also spent time with Premier Development League side Michigan Bucks.

Professional 
Shepherd was drafted in the second round, 46th overall, in the 2018 MLS SuperDraft by Toronto FC on January 19, 2018. Shepherd signed with Toronto FC II, the club's USL affiliate. He made his debut on May 30, 2018, starting against Ottawa Fury FC, but was substituted in the 16th minute after injuring himself when conceding a penalty. He also appeared in a match for Toronto FC III in League1 Ontario.

References 

1994 births
Living people
American soccer players
American expatriate soccer players
Association football goalkeepers
Flint City Bucks players
Soccer players from Michigan
Sportspeople from Ann Arbor, Michigan
Toronto FC draft picks
Toronto FC II players
USL Championship players
USL League Two players
Western Michigan Broncos men's soccer players